In mathematics, the Riesz–Fischer theorem in real analysis is any of a number of closely related results concerning the properties of the space L2 of square integrable functions.  The theorem was proven independently in 1907 by Frigyes Riesz and Ernst Sigismund Fischer.

For many authors, the Riesz–Fischer theorem refers to the fact that the Lp spaces  from Lebesgue integration theory are complete.

Modern forms of the theorem 

where  the nth Fourier coefficient, is given by

then

where  is the -norm.

Conversely, if  is a two-sided sequence of complex numbers (that is, its indices range from negative infinity to positive infinity) such that

then there exists a function f such that f is square-integrable and the values  are the Fourier coefficients of f.

This form of the Riesz–Fischer theorem is a stronger form of Bessel's inequality, and can be used to prove Parseval's identity for Fourier series.

Other results are often called the Riesz–Fischer theorem .  Among them is the theorem that, if A is an orthonormal set in a Hilbert space H, and  then

for all but countably many  and
 
Furthermore, if A is an orthonormal basis for H and x an arbitrary vector, the series

converges  (or ) to x.  This is equivalent to saying that for every  there exists a finite set  in A such that

for every finite set B containing B0. Moreover, the following conditions on the set A are equivalent:
 the set A is an orthonormal basis of H
 for every vector  

Another result, which also sometimes bears the name of Riesz and Fischer, is the theorem that  (or more generally ) is complete.

Example 
The Riesz–Fischer theorem also applies in a more general setting.  Let R be an inner product space consisting of functions (for example, measurable functions on the line, analytic functions in the unit disc; in old literature, sometimes called Euclidean Space), and let  be an orthonormal system in R (e.g. Fourier basis, Hermite or Laguerre polynomials, etc. – see orthogonal polynomials), not necessarily complete (in an inner product space, an orthonormal set is complete if no nonzero vector is orthogonal to every vector in the set).  The theorem asserts that if the normed space R is complete (thus R is a Hilbert space), then any sequence  that has finite  norm defines a function f in the space R.

The function f is defined by
 limit in R-norm.

Combined with the Bessel's inequality, we know the converse as well: if f is a function in R, then the Fourier coefficients  have finite  norm.

History: the Note of Riesz and the Note of Fischer (1907) 

In his Note,  states the following result (translated here to modern language at one point: the notation  was not used in 1907).

The convergence of the series  is a necessary and sufficient condition for the existence of a function f such that 
Today, this result of Riesz is a special case of basic facts about series of orthogonal vectors in Hilbert spaces.

Riesz's Note appeared in March. Here is the statement, translated from French:
Theorem. If a sequence of functions belonging to  converges in the mean, there exists in  a function f towards which the sequence converges in the mean.
Fischer goes on proving the preceding result of Riesz, as a consequence of the orthogonality of the system, and of the completeness of 

Fischer's proof of completeness is somewhat indirect. It uses the fact that the indefinite integrals of the functions gn in the given Cauchy sequence, namely  

The existence of the limit  for the Cauchy sequence is obtained by applying to G differentiation theorems from Lebesgue's theory. 
Riesz uses a similar reasoning in his Note, but makes no explicit mention to the completeness of  although his result may be interpreted this way. He says that integrating term by term a trigonometric series with given square summable coefficients, he gets a series converging uniformly to a continuous  function F  with bounded variation. The derivative f  of F, defined almost everywhere, is square summable and has for Fourier coefficients the given coefficients.

Completeness of Lp,  0 < p ≤ ∞ 

For some authors, notably Royden, the Riesz-Fischer Theorem is the result that  is complete: that every Cauchy sequence of functions in  converges to a function in  under the metric induced by the p-norm.

When  the Minkowski inequality implies that the Lp space  is a normed space. In order to prove that  is complete, i.e. that  is a Banach space,  it is enough (see e.g. Banach space#Definition) to prove that every series  of functions in  such that

converges in the -norm to some function  For  the Minkowski inequality and the monotone convergence theorem imply that

is defined –almost everywhere and  The dominated convergence theorem is then used to prove that the partial sums of the series converge to f in the -norm,

The case  requires some modifications, because the p-norm is no longer subadditive. One starts with the stronger assumption that

and uses repeatedly that

The case  reduces to a simple question about uniform convergence outside a -negligible set.

See also

References 

 .
 .
 .
 .

Fourier series
Theorems in real analysis